Sila may refer to :

Places and jurisdictions 
 Asia
 Silla, one of the three kingdoms of ancient Korea
 Sila, Abu Dhabi, United Arab Emirates
 Europe
 La Sila, a mountainous area of Calabria, Italy
 Sila National Park
 Siła, Warmian-Masurian Voivodeship, a village in Poland
 Africa 
 Sila, Numidia, a former Ancient city and bishopric, now Bordj-El-Ksar in Algeria and a Latin Catholic titular see
 Sila Region, Chad
 Sila Department, Chad, part of Sila Region since 2008

Religion and Mythology 

 Śīla (in Sanskrit) or sīla (in Pāli), "behavioral discipline", "morality", "virtue" or "ethics" in Buddhism
 Sila (mythology), in Arab folklore a type of jinn, or genie
 Sila (murti), in Hinduism a murti or vigraha in the form of a stone
 Silap Inua (sila), in Inuit mythology, the primary component of everything that exists

Entertainment 
 Sila (2016 TV series), a Pakistani drama series
 Silaa, a 2020 album by Zubeen Garg
 Sıla (TV series), a Turkish television series
 Sila (film), a 1988 Indian film directed by B. R. Ishara
 Sila and the Afrofunk Experience, a band with lead singer Sila Mutungi

People 
 Sıla (given name), Turkish feminine name
 Sila María Calderón (born 1942), Puerto Rican politician
 Music
 Sila Godoy (1919–2014), Paraguayan guitarist
 Sıla Gençoğlu (born 1980), Turkish singer
 Sports
 Sila Srikampang (born 1989), Thai footballer
 Alo Sila, American football player

Other uses 
 SiLA (airlines), a Russian regional airline
 Sila people, an ethnic group of Vietnam and Laos
 Sila language (Sino-Tibetan), a language of Vietnam and Laos
 Sila language (Chad), a language of Chad
 Aero East Europe Sila, a Serbian family of light aircraft
 Society of Illustrators of Los Angeles, a not-for-profit organization
 Svensk Interkontinental Lufttrafik AB, a Swedish airline
 Standardization in Lab Automation, a not-for-profit organization
 The primary body of Sila–Nunam, an object in the Solar System

See also 
 Scylla (disambiguation)
 Silas (disambiguation)
 Silla (disambiguation)
 Shila (disambiguation)
 Selah (disambiguation)